The Faculty of Georesources and Materials Engineering is one of nine faculties at the RWTH Aachen University. It comprises three sections for Raw Materials and Waste Disposal Technology, Metallurgy and Materials Technology and Geoscience and Geology. The faculty was found in 1880 and produced several notable individuals, including Friedrich Robert Helmert. Approximately 3,000 students are enrolled in the faculty.

Degrees awarded

The following degrees are awarded in Geoscience and Geography, Raw Materials and Waste Disposal Technology, or Metallurgy and Materials Technology:

 Bachelor of Science
 Master of Science
 Diplom
 Doctor

History
Already with the establishment of the RWTH Aachen as the Royal Rhine-Westphalian Polytechnical School on October 10, 1870, the chairs for mining and metallurgy were set up beside the fields of building construction, hydraulic construction as well as road and railway construction. A chemistry laboratory was also among the facilities. Around the turn of the 20th century, the chair of metallurgy of iron developed to a center of leading technology.

After the transformation of the institution into a technical university, the fourth faculty was formed as the Faculty of Mining, Chemistry and Metallurgy. The department of Chemistry remained until 1940 within the faculty to be incorporated then into the Faculty of Natural Sciences. The faculty was later renamed Faculty of Mining, Metallurgy and Geosciences.

The RWTH Aachen University was one of the only three technological institutions in Germany, the others being Berlin Institute of Technology and Clausthal University of Technology, featuring the disciplines of mining and metallurgy.

References

External links
 Faculty of Georesources and Materials Engineering (English version)

RWTH Aachen University